Three Fact Fader is the second full-length studio album by British shoegazing band Engineers, released on 6 July 2009 through the Kscope label. The album was produced by the band along with Ken Thomas, who also worked with Sigur Rós, M83 and Maps, with artwork created by Tom Sheehan.

To start promoting the record, the band played their first live gig in over two years on 10 July 2009 at the Bush Hall in London. They were joined onstage by special guest Ulrich Schnauss (who would later join Engineers as a full-time member). Richard Barbieri of British progressive rock group Porcupine Tree also performed that night.

The Three Fact Fader minisite was set up by Kscope containing information about the album. A single for "Clean Coloured Wire" was released on 20 July 2009, and a video clip for the song was released through the minisite to accompany the single. The minisite also includes an excerpt of a remix of the song "Sometimes I Realise" by British musician, record producer, and Kscope label founder Steven Wilson.

The entire album was available for streaming through the website of NME.

Track listing

Track 1 incorporates a sample of "Watussi" from the first Harmonia album Musik Von Harmonia, written by Hans-Joachim Roedelius, Dieter Moebius, and Michael Rother.

Singles
 "Clean Coloured Wire" (20 July 2009)
 "Clean Coloured Wire" (Radio Edit)
 "Clean Coloured Wire" (SeriousMusic 438 kHz Mix)
 "Be What You Are" (Chicken Feed Remix)
 "Sometimes I Realise" (Steven Wilson Remix)
 "What Pushed Us Together" (7 December 2009)
 "What Pushed Us Together"
 "What Pushed Us Together" (A Ricardo Tobar Remix)

Personnel

Musicians
Simon Phipps – lead vocals, guitars
Mark Peters – guitars, bass, programming and backing vocals
Dan MacBean – guitars, keyboards programming and bass
Andrew Sweeney – drums and backing vocals

Producers
Produced and mixed by Ken Thomas and Engineers.
Assisted by Ben Hampson, Jeff Knowler, and Ben Thackerey.
Track 6 mixed by Engineers and Ben Thackerey; additional mixing by Ken Thomas.
Tracks 12 and 13 produced and mixed by Mark Peters and Dan MacBean; assisted by Fred Vessey.
Recorded at Rockfield Studio, Wales; Jacob's Studios, Surrey; and Engineers Studio, Rainford, Merseyside.
Mixed at Miloco's Engine Room, London.
Tracks 12 and 13 mixed at Brittania Row Studio, London.
String quartet on tracks 4, 10, and 11 arranged by Mark Peters and Dan MacBean; recorded at Townhouse Studios, London.
Mastered by John Davis at Alchemy; except for tracks 12 and 13 mastered by Dick Beeson at 360 Mastering.

Graphic artists
Tom Sheehan – cover photography and concept
Justin Lambert – press photography
Engineers – other photography
Scott Robinson – other photography, website design, and CD package design

References

External links
Three Fact Fader minisite

2009 albums
Engineers (band) albums
Kscope albums